Mundina Nildana is a 2019 Indian Kannada-language film written and directed by Vinay Bharadwaj, and produced by Coastal Breeze Productions. The film stars Praveen Tej, Radhika Chetan and Ananya Kashyap in lead roles.

The posters are designed by the 'Rudra Hanuman' fame painter Karan Acharya. The sound design is done by award-winning Ajay Kumar PB (Badlapur, Andhadhun fame). While the movie has seven songs composed by seven different music directors, the background score is done by Jim Satya who has worked on notable movies like Barfi, Yeh Jawani Hai Deewani. The coloring of the film is done by colorist Siddhartha Gandhi from Shah Rukh Khan's Red Chillies. Dialogues are written by Abhishek Iyengar. The movie's VFX is done by Pixel Digital Studios who has worked on notable movies like Baahubali and Gully Boy.

Plot
Partha, Meera, and Ahana who are completely different from each other have set out on a liberating journey that is taking them to their next destination. All three characters have diverging personalities and different goals that they are chasing after.

Partha is endeavoring in a corporate environment trying to break free from it, as his real passion is photography. Ahana is an ambitious medical student who is a fun-loving millennial who does not believe in commitments. Meera is an art curator and a self-sufficient woman who is looking for a soul mate.

In this process of discovering relationships, love, friendship, passion, and career, they take you through a fun-filled journey.

Cast
 Praveen Tej as Partha Srivastav
 Radhika Chetan as Meera Sharma 
 Ananya Kashyap. as Ahana Kashyap
 Ajay Raj as Ekalavya
 Dattanna as Kris
 Shankar Ashwath as Partha's Dad
 Diksha Sharma as Zoya
 Vinay Bharadwaj as himself
 Kshama Santosh Rai as Dr Sakshi
 Siddharth Bhat as Traffic Police

Soundtrack
The album has seven songs composed by seven different music directors.

Production
Produced by Coastal Breeze Productions, the movie's shoot began in January 2019 and ended in April. The shoot was done in Bangalore, Sakleshpur, Kolar, Himachal Pradesh and Netherlands. The post-production was done in Bangalore, Mumbai, and Chennai.

Release
The movie was released on the 29 November 2019. Dialogues are written by Abhishek Iyengar. The movie's VFX is done by Pixel Digital Studios who has worked on notable movies like Baahubali and Gully Boy.

Awards and nominations

References

External links

2010s Kannada-language films
Films scored by Masala Coffee